Plutonides is a genus of Middle Cambrian trilobite in the family Paradoxididae with species Plutonides sedgwickii and possibly Plutonides? illingi. Several other species and subspecies were at times placed in Plutonides but have subsequently been moved to other genera.

TC-1 & CF-1 of Rees et al.]

Type 
Plutonia sedgwickii is the type species for the genus and was first described in 1871 as "Plutonia" sedgwickii.  However the genus name "Plutonia" had already been used for the Vitrinidae snail genus Plutonia by Morelet in Stabile (1864), and so the new genus Plutonides was coined by Hicks (1895). The species Lectotype is SM A1086, an internal mould of cranidium,.

Species 
Paradoxides cf. sedgwickii, described by Smith and White (1963) from the Baltoparadoxides pinus Biosubzone in the upper part of the Purley Shale Formation of Warwickshire, central England was redescribed by Rushton (1966, p. 42, pl. 6, figs. 1-10)  as ‘Paradoxides’ sedgwickii porphyrus. The subspecies has broader palpebral lobes and finer surface granulation than observed in P. sedgwickii sedgwickii.

Vanĕk et al. (1999)  described cranidia from the Middle Cambrian of Skrije - Týřovice area in the Czech Republic as Plutonides hicksi, although the specimens illustrated are of a different species to that from Wales.  Fletcher (2007) however, has also since established the new subgenus, Paradoxides (Mawddachites), to include P. hicksii as type species. Alvarez et al. (2010) raised Mawddachites to a full genus.

References 

Paradoxidoidea
Cambrian trilobites of Asia
Fossils of Mongolia
Fossils of Russia
Cambrian trilobites of Europe
Fossils of Sweden
Fossils of Great Britain
Cambrian trilobites of North America
Fossils of Canada
Paleontology in Newfoundland and Labrador
Paleontology in Nova Scotia
Fossil taxa described in 1895
Cambrian genus extinctions